The name Zellweger is a noble lineage of the Appenzell area, Switzerland, and may refer to:

People with the surname Zellweger:
 Hans Zellweger (1909–1990), Swiss-American pediatrician and namesake of Zellweger syndrome
 Marc Zellweger (born 1973), Swiss football defender
 Renée Zellweger (born 1969), Academy Award-winning American film actress
 Shea Zellweger (1925–2022), American educator

Furthermore, the name Zellweger may refer to:

 Zellweger off-peak, the brand-name of an electric switching device
 Zellweger syndrome, a rare congenital disorder
 Zellweger spectrum disorders, a group of rare disorders

References 

Swiss-German surnames
German-language surnames
Swiss noble families